The Estadio Israel Barrios is a football stadium in Coatepeque, Guatemala. It was inaugurated on January 30, 2011. Its construction started in 2009, with funding from local entrepreneur Israel Barrios (after whom the stadium is named), who aims to finish the project in coming years.

The venue is currently the home of football club Deportivo Coatepeque, who compete in the Liga Nacional de Fútbol de Guatemala in the Guatemalan football league system.

During 2011 it has been planned for the stadium to host games of the Guatemala national football team, upon approval of the venue by FIFA.

Location
The Israel Barrios is located in Coatepeque, Guatemala in the Rivera de la Vega, Zone 6, near the Campo de la Feria.

References

Israel Barrios